The Yugoslav Navy (Jugoslavenska ratna mornarica; JRM) was the naval branch of the Yugoslav People's Army (Jugoslavenska narodna armija; JNA). Organized as a coastal defence force with the main task of preventing enemy landings on its long and indented coastline, the navy's inventory reflected its foreign relations as well as the growing capabilities of its domestic shipyards and scientific institutions. The period immediately after the end of the Second World War was marked by relying on equipment that was captured, salvaged or obtained from the Western Bloc through reparations or lend-lease programs.

Improved relations with the Soviet Union after Stalin's death meant the acquisition of Eastern military equipment was once again possible. This was soon after realized with torpedo and missile boats of Soviet origin being commissioned with the JRM. The 1960s and 1970s marked the start of a period of reliance on indigenous designs. Domestic naval programs developed by the Brodarski Institut from Zagreb and built in Yugoslav Shipyards included submarines, frigates, patrol boats, missile boats as well as other support ships, with some of them being exported to other countries.

The JRM came to its de facto end in 1991 with the escalation of the Croatian War of Independence. The Navy was engaged in imposing a naval blockade of Croatia which culminated in November with the Battle of the Dalmatian Channels. Having lost the majority of its naval infrastructure which was located in the now independent Croatia, the fleet eventually retreated to Boka Kotorska, Montenegro where it was officially disbanded in early 1992 with the remaining ships being commissioned with the new Navy of the Federal Republic of Yugoslavia. The FR Yugoslav Navy included around 80% of the JRM pre-war fleet, with the remaining 20% being lost or captured by Croatian Forces.

Submarines 

The JRM maintained a submarine force throughout its existence. The first submarines to be commissioned were three submarines captured or returned after the Second World War. Starting with the 1950s and the Sutjeska class Yugoslavia operated domestically built submarines. The Heroj class marked a significant technological leap in Yugoslav shipbuilding capabilities with the Brodogradilište specijalnih objekata (Special objects shipyard) in Split becoming the shipyard where all of the remaining boats would eventually be built. All submarines with the exception of Mališan and the Heroj-class boats were named after rivers in Yugoslavia.

The last class of Yugoslav submarines was the Una-class midget submarines which, unlike their larger predecessor, did not carry any torpedo armament and were designed for covert special operations. A new class of larger submarines armed with torpedoes and anti-ship missiles, dubbed the Lora class or Project B-73, was planned but was not started due to the subsequent Breakup of Yugoslavia. By 1991 the JRM operated eleven submarines homeported in the Lora Naval Base in Split. With the start of the Croatian War of Independence all except one Una class were relocated to Montenegro where they were commissioned with the FR Yugoslav Navy.

Destroyers

Destroyer escorts

Frigates

Corvette

Fast attack craft 

The JRM operated a large number of fast attack craft, commissioning both torpedo and missile boats of different origin. One of the first torpedo boats to enter service with the JRM after the war were the eight American MT-class motor torpedo boats, PT boats built by Higgins which received designations from MT1 to MT8. Starting with 1951 up to 1960, Yugoslav shipyards, mainly on the island of Korčula, constructed somewhere between 75 and 96 Higgins torpedo boats, with sources being conflicting regarding the exact number. In the early 1960s a number of them were converted to motor gun boats by removing the torpedo tubes. The last Higgins hulls were deleted by 1979. Improved relations with the Soviet Union from the 1960s made buying eastern military equipment once again possible; acquisition of ten Osa I-class missile boats started in 1965 becoming the first ships of the Yugoslav Navy to be armed with anti-ship missiles. Four Shershen-class torpedo boats were commissioned around the same time with ten additional boats being licence built at the Kraljevica Shipyard.

The 1970s saw the introduction of six Končar-class missile boats featuring a mixture of Soviet and Swedish weaponry. At the time of the escalation of the Croatian War of Independence, the first ship of a new class of missile boats was being built at the Kraljevica Shipyard.

Torpedo boats

Missile boats

Patrol boats

Mine warfare

Landing craft 

The Yugoslav Partisans captured several landing craft during the last stages of the Second World War. Among them were two former Italian MZ-type craft which were deleted by 1979 and a single ex-German MFP. An unknown number of Siebel ferrys was also commissioned. During the 1950s Yugoslav shipyards built a large number of landing craft based on German war designs designating them as DTMs (Desantni Tenkonosac-Minopolagač, tank landing craft-minelayer), DSMs (Desantna Splav-Minopolagač, landing craft-minelayer) and PDSs (Pomoćna Desantna Splav, auxiliary landing craft). Several of these craft were captured by the Croatians, but only PDS-713, DSM-110 and DTM-110 were commissioned with the Croatian Navy, with the fate of the remaining ones left over in Croatian, unknown.

During the 1970s and 1980s the "Montmontaža Greben Shipyard" on the island of Korčula built a large number of Type 11 and Type 22 landing-assault craft intended for transporting troops and cargo. Although sharing a common design, the two types featured a different carrying capacity, propulsion system and weapons. The last class of landing ships to be commissioned with the Yugoslav Navy was the Silba-class landing ship-minelayers. At the start of the Croatian War of Independence one ship was in active service while another one was being built. Named Rab, the unfinished ship was captured by the Croatians, completed and commissioned with the Croatian Navy as Cetina (DBM-81).

Auxiliaries

Tugboats

See also 
List of active Croatian Navy ships
List of ships of the Royal Yugoslav Navy

Notes

References 
Books

News reports

Other sources

Ships of the Yugoslav Navy
Yugoslav